The Rolls-Royce RB282 is a new series of twin-spool turbofan engines under development by Rolls-Royce.

The first variant of this engine was intended to power the future Dassault Falcon 5X super mid-sized business jet, the replacement for the Falcon 50 EX, due to enter service in 2012. The engine should develop 10,000 pounds of thrust. In October 2013, Dassault chose to power the Falcon 5X with the Snecma Silvercrest instead.

References

RB282
2000s turbofan engines